Contrasts is an album by American organist Larry Young recorded in 1967 and released on the Blue Note label.

Reception
The Allmusic review by Scott Yanow awarded the album 4 stars and stated "The adventurous music is sometimes quite intense but also grooves in its own eccentric way, offering listeners a very fresh sound on organ".

Track listing
All compositions by Larry Young except as indicated.

 "Majestic Soul" - 11:58
 "Evening" - 7:12
 "Major Affair" - 3:50
 "Wild Is the Wind" (Dimitri Tiomkin, Ned Washington) - 4:31
 "Tender Feelings" (Tyrone Washington) - 6:51
 "Means Happiness" - 4:47

Personnel
Larry Young - organ
Hank White - flugelhorn (tracks 1, 2, 5–6)
Herbert Morgan, Tyrone Washington - tenor saxophone (tracks 1, 2, 5–6)
Eddie Wright - guitar (tracks 1 & 4)
Eddie Gladden - drums
Stacey Edwards - congas (tracks 1, 2, 4–5)
Althea Young - vocals (track 4)

References

Blue Note Records albums
Larry Young (musician) albums
1968 albums
Albums recorded at Van Gelder Studio
Albums produced by Alfred Lion